Frederick Schaeffer may refer to:

 Frederick Christian Schaeffer (1792–1832), Lutheran clergyman of the United States
 Frederick David Schaeffer (1760–1836), German-American Lutheran clergyman

See also
 Fred K. Schaefer (1904–1953), geographer